Phillip Margolin (born 1944) is an American writer of legal thrillers.

Biography
Margolin was born in New York City in 1944. After receiving a B.A. in Government in 1965, from American University in Washington, D.C., he worked as a Peace Corps volunteer in Liberia until 1967. He graduated from the New York University School of Law in 1970, and has worked for 25 years as a criminal defense attorney, an occupation of choice inspired by the Perry Mason books. He started to work in 1970 at the Oregon Court of Appeals.

He published his first story, a short story titled "The Girl in the Yellow Bikini", in 1974, and became a full-time writer in 1996. He has written 12 books as of January 2007. He lists as his favourite writer Joseph Conrad, and among his favourite books War and Peace by Leo Tolstoy and Stone City by Mitchell Smith.

Philip Margolin was married to Doreen Stamm in 1968.  They had two children, Ami and Daniel.  Doreen, also an attorney, died from cancer in January 2007. In 2018, he married Melanie Nelson.

Phillip Margolin is also the president of Chess for Success, a non-profit organisation "dedicated to helping children develop skills necessary for success in school and life by learning chess".

Bibliography

He has also co-authored Vanishing Acts (Madison Kincaid Mystery) with his daughter Ami Margolin Rome.

Awards and recognitions
 1978: nominated for an Edgar Award for best original paperback by the Mystery Writers of America for Heartstone
 1999: the short story The Jailhouse Lawyer is published in the 1999 edition of The Best American Mystery Stories

Notes

External links
His homepage
Author page at his publisher HarperCollins

1944 births
20th-century American novelists
21st-century American novelists
American male novelists
American thriller writers
Living people
Oregon lawyers
Writers from Portland, Oregon
20th-century American male writers
21st-century American male writers
Novelists from Oregon